The Construction Industry Institute (CII), based at The University of Texas at Austin, is a non-profit consortium of more than 130 owner, engineering-contractor, and supplier firms from both the public and private arenas. The group aims to enhance the business effectiveness and sustainability of the capital facility life cycle through research, related initiatives and industry alliances. Stephen Mulva was named the Director in December 2016. In March 2022, Mulva was replaced with an interim director.

Best practices 
A best practice is a process or method that, when executed effectively, leads to enhanced project performance. CII Best Practices have been proven through extensive industry use and/or validation. CII Best Practices include the following 17 topics:
 Advanced Work Packaging
 Alignment
 Benchmarking & Metrics
 Change Management
 Constructability
 Disputes Prevention & Resolution
 Front End Planning
 Implementation of CII Research
 Lessons Learned
 Materials Management
 Partnering
 Planning for Modularization
 Planning for Startup
 Project Risk Assessment
 Quality Management
 Team Building
 Zero Accidents Techniques

CII has also researched other practices and information topics, which have been organized into a Knowledge Base. CII's professional development programs help organizations to plan the development of new construction project managers by applying CII Best Practices and other competencies to the managers' professional development.

References

External links
 CII official website

Non-profit organizations based in Texas